Vexillum (Vexillum) intermedium, common name : the intermediate mitre, is a species of small sea snail, marine gastropod mollusk in the family Costellariidae, the ribbed miters.

Description

Distribution
This species occurs in the Red Sea, in the Indian Ocean along Madagascar and in the Pacific Ocean along Queensland, Australia.

References

 Dautzenberg, Ph. (1929). Mollusques testacés marins de Madagascar. Faune des Colonies Francaises, Tome III
 Turner H. 2001. Katalog der Familie Costellariidae Macdonald, 1860. Conchbooks. 1–100 page(s): 38
 Sharabati, D. (1984) Red Sea Shells. KPI Limited, London, 128 pp. page(s): pl. 25
 Steyn, D.G & Lussi, M. (2005). Offshore Shells of Southern Africa: A pictorial guide to more than 750 Gastropods. Published by the authors. Pp. i–vi, 1–289.

External links
 Sowerby, G. B., III. (1889). Descriptions of fourteen new species of shells from China, Japan, and the Andaman Islands, chiefly collected by Deputy Surgeon-Gen. R. Hungerford. Proceedings of the Zoological Society of London. 56: 565-570, pl. 28
 

intermedium
Gastropods described in 1838